The Malice at the Palace (also known as the Pacers–Pistons brawl) occurred during a National Basketball Association (NBA) game between the Indiana Pacers and the defending champion Detroit Pistons on Friday, November 19, 2004, at The Palace in Auburn Hills, Michigan, United States. The Associated Press (AP) called it "the most infamous brawl in NBA history."

With the Pacers leading 97–82 and 45.9 seconds left in the game, Pistons center Ben Wallace attempted a layup shot but was fouled from behind by Pacers small forward Ron Artest. A furious Wallace then shoved Artest, and a fight broke out on the court between a few players from both squads. The players had been separated, game officials were discussing consequences, and Artest was laying on the scorer's table when a fan named John Green hit him with a drink thrown from several rows up in the stands.

Artest immediately charged into the crowd and grabbed another fan, Michael Ryan, whom he mistakenly believed was the culprit. Several Pacer teammates followed, more drinks and punches were thrown, and the incident escalated into a large brawl that spread from the stands to the court and involved fans and players from both teams. The game was never completed as a massive police presence was called to the venue to restore order and, later, to allow the visiting Pacers to safely leave the building.

After the game, the NBA suspended nine players, including Artest and Wallace, for a total of 146 games, leading to the players losing US$11 million in salary. Five players were charged with assault, and eventually sentenced to a year of probation and community service. Five fans also faced assault charges and were banned from attending Pistons home games for life. The fight also led the NBA to increase security between players and fans and limit the sale of alcohol at games.

Background 
The Indiana Pacers and Detroit Pistons had not met since the previous season's Eastern Conference Finals, which the Pistons won in six games en route to their first NBA title since the "Bad Boys" era of the late 1980s and early 1990s. Coming off a two-game winning streak, the Pacers held a 6–2 record, while the defending champion Pistons had begun their season 4–3. The game was televised nationally on ESPN along with both teams' local broadcast affiliates, FSN Midwest and WDIV (Detroit's NBC affiliate).

The game, like many previous meetings between the two teams, was dominated by defense. The Pacers got off to a quick start, opening up a 20-point lead with seven minutes to go before halftime. The Pistons managed to cut into the lead, trailing by 16 points by halftime. The Pistons opened the third quarter with a 9–2 run, but the Pacers ended it with a buzzer-beating three-pointer and a layup from Jamaal Tinsley heading into the fourth quarter.

Richard Hamilton and Lindsey Hunter started the last quarter with consecutive three-point field goals as the Pistons cut into the lead again. But Stephen Jackson's back-to-back field goals pushed the lead back to 93–79 with 3:52 remaining, essentially putting the Pistons away. Despite the lopsided score near the end of the game, most key players on both teams remained in the game.

The Pacers were led by the 24-point effort of small forward Ron Artest, who scored 17 in the first quarter. Jermaine O'Neal notched a double-double with 20 points and 13 rebounds. Tinsley had 13 points, eight assists and a career-high eight steals. Hamilton led the Pistons with 20 points. Rasheed Wallace and Ben Wallace both recorded a double-double.

Fight

The brawl began with 45.9 seconds remaining in the final quarter of the game, when the Pacers led 97–82. Pistons center Ben Wallace was fouled from behind by Artest, who slapped him across the back of the head during a layup attempt. Wallace later said that Artest had warned him he would be hit. Wallace responded by shoving Artest in the face with both hands, causing players from both teams to quickly get in between them as they attempted to keep the two separated.

Pistons coach Larry Brown later said he was initially not concerned, because when altercations occur in NBA games, they usually last a few seconds. After breaking up the confrontation, referees discussed fouls and ejections before the game resumed. Sportscaster Mike Breen, calling the game for ESPN, believed Wallace would be ejected, while Bill Walton was of the opinion that Stephen Jackson should be ejected as well for shouting at the Pistons players and aggravating the situation. However, Breen expressed concern that, if Wallace got ejected, he would have to walk past the Pacers bench, which could have caused another incident.

As the referees huddled to discuss penalties, Artest went to the scorer's table and laid himself on it, putting on a headset to speak with Pacers radio broadcaster Mark Boyle, though the broadcast team did not activate his microphone. Boyle recalled that the broadcasting team knew Artest's personality and "there was no way we were going to put an open mic in front of Ron Artest in that situation". Pacers president Donnie Walsh later stated that Artest was following advice he had received on how to calm down and avoid trouble in a volatile situation.

Ninety seconds after Wallace shoved Artest, most of both teams' players and coaches were huddled at midcourt, attempting to calm down Wallace. Tayshaun Prince was the only player on either team to not leave the bench during the entire incident. Others became automatically eligible for one-game suspensions. While Artest was lying on the table, Wallace threw a towel at him, causing Artest to briefly stand up before being held back by coaches. A spectator, John Green, then threw a plastic cup of Diet Coke at Artest, hitting him in the chest. 

Artest immediately reacted to this by jumping off the table, charging into the stands, and grabbing another spectator, Michael Ryan, whom he mistakenly believed was responsible. Artest shouted at Ryan, "Did you do it?", to which Ryan replied, "No, man. No!" Boyle stood from his chair at the broadcast table in an attempt to hold back Artest and was knocked backwards and stepped on, suffering five fractured vertebrae and a gouge on his head. Afterwards, Artest apologized to Boyle and said he hadn't realized he'd trampled him.

Jackson followed Artest into the stands and punched a fan, William Paulson, in the face in retaliation for the man throwing another drink in Artest's face while he was being restrained by other spectators. Pacers players Eddie Gill, David Harrison, Reggie Miller (who did not play because of an injury), Fred Jones, and Jamaal Tinsley, the Pistons' Rasheed Wallace, and numerous personnel (including Pistons radio analyst and former player Rick Mahorn) also quickly entered the stands to get Artest and Jackson, and to break up the fighting. Green punched Artest twice in the head from behind, as did Ben Wallace's brother, David, to Jones. More fans then began throwing drinks, food, and other objects into the melee and some fans went on the court in the confusion.

As Artest walked out of the stands, he was confronted by two more fans, Alvin "A.J." Shackleford and Charlie Haddad, who had gone down to the court. Artest punched Shackleford in the face, causing Haddad to intervene by pushing away Artest, before both fans fell over. While Haddad was on the floor, Anthony Johnson struck him in the back of the head. As Haddad stood up, Jermaine O'Neal punched him in the jaw after a running start, while slipping in liquid and falling backwards, causing witnesses Scot Pollard, ESPN sideline reporter Jim Gray, and Pistons executive Tom Wilson to briefly fear that O'Neal would kill Haddad. 

O'Neal later claimed that Haddad had been asked to leave the arena earlier that night, and was well known to security because of claims that he wanted to fight an NBA player in order to receive compensation. William Wesley, Austin Croshere, and Miller pulled Artest away from the fans, and Brown tried to calm Wallace. The scene became more chaotic as additional fans went onto the court and additional items were thrown, overwhelming arena security personnel as they tried to reestablish order. Although Auburn Hills police had plans to handle many disorders, and had three officers in the arena, they were unprepared for the possibility of players entering the stands or masses of fans going onto the court.

Pacers coach Rick Carlisle said, "I felt like I was fighting for my life out there." One reporter who attempted to stop Tinsley from entering the stands recalled that the player "went through me like I was butter", and NBA Commissioner David Stern, watching the game on television, recalled that he said, "Holy [mouths a swear word]." O'Neal later said, "As bad as it looked on TV, it was at least 20 times worse in person." Pacers assistant coach Chuck Person compared the situation to being "trapped in a gladiator-type scene where the fans were the lions and we were just trying to escape with our lives. That's how it felt. That there was no exit. That you had to fight your way out." Players' children and others in the audience cried from fear and shock. Derrick Coleman stood near Brown and Brown's ball boy son to protect them.

Referees ended the game with 45.9 seconds remaining, and awarded the Pacers with a 97–82 win. Pistons fans booed the Pacers players as they were escorted from the court by officials and security, and continued to throw beverages, popcorn and other objects (including a steel folding chair that nearly hit O'Neal) at them as they walked under the tunnel to the locker room. Brown tried to talk to the fans over the loudspeaker of the arena in an attempt to stop the debacle, but his pleas availed nothing, and he threw down the microphone in exasperation.

Pistons public address announcer John Mason implored the remaining crowd to leave the court and arena because the game was over, and pleaded with fans to not throw any objects or engage in fighting. No players from either team spoke to the media before leaving the arena. Eventually, police officers swarmed the arena, threatening to handcuff those who would not leave. Nine spectators were injured, and two were taken to the hospital.

In the Pacers' locker room, O'Neal and Carlisle nearly got into a fight, as O'Neal was upset that some coaches had tried to restrain players while they were defending themselves out on the court. After everyone calmed down, Artest asked Jackson, "Jack, you think we going to get in trouble?" Jackson replied, "Are you serious, bro? Trouble? Ron, we'll be lucky if we still have a freaking job!" The conversation convinced an amazed Jackson and Pollard that Artest "wasn't in his right mind, to ask that question".

Auburn Hills police entered the locker room to make arrests, but the team rushed Artest onto the bus and refused to take him off. The police decided to protect the Pacers as they left the arena, delaying decisions about criminal charges and arrests until after reviewing videos of the incident. By the time the Pacers' team bus departed, dozens of police cruisers were stationed in the parking lot and lined the surrounding road.

Charges

Suspensions
On November 20, 2004, the NBA suspended Artest, Jackson, O'Neal, and Wallace indefinitely, saying that their actions were "shocking, repulsive, and inexcusable". The following day, the NBA announced that nine players would be suspended for a total of what eventually became 146 games: 137 games for Pacers players and nine games for Pistons players. David Harrison was also seen fighting with fans, but the NBA stated that he would not be suspended because "the incident occurred as the players were attempting to leave the floor".

Artest was given the longest suspension; he was suspended for the remainder of the 2004–05 NBA season, a suspension that eventually totaled 86 games (73 regular season and 13 subsequent playoff games), the longest suspension for an on-court incident in NBA history. The players suspended also lost in excess of US$11 million in salary due to the suspensions, with Artest alone losing almost US$5 million.

In the week following the announcement of the suspensions, the players' union appealed the suspensions of Artest, Jackson, and O'Neal, saying they thought that commissioner Stern had "exceeded his authority". Jackson felt that despite losing millions the players were fortunate, as Stern could have expelled them from the league entirely.

A federal arbitrator upheld the full length of all suspensions, except that of O'Neal, which was reduced to 15 games. However, the NBA appealed the decision of the arbitrator to reduce O'Neal's suspension in federal court, and on December 24, a judge issued a temporary injunction allowing O'Neal to play until a full hearing was held on the NBA's appeal.

O'Neal played in two more games before the NBA's case was brought before the U.S. District Court in Brooklyn, New York, on December 30. The NBA argued that under the terms of the league's Collective Bargaining Agreement (CBA), Stern had absolute authority to hand out suspensions and hear appeals for all on-court incidents. However, the judge ruled that because O'Neal's behavior was an off-court incident, arbitration was allowed under the CBA and thus the arbitrator was within his rights to reduce the suspension. Despite O'Neal's successful appeal, no further appeals were made to reduce Artest's and Jackson's suspensions.

Legal charges
Auburn Hills police obtained videotapes of media coverage of the fight. Green was identified by county prosecutor David Gorcyca, who had been his neighbor. On November 30, Palace Sports and Entertainment, the owner of the Pistons, banned Green and Haddad from attending any events at the Palace of Auburn Hills, including Pistons home games and the DTE Energy Music Theatre, revoked their season tickets and issued them refunds. Green had several previous criminal convictions, including counterfeiting, carrying a concealed weapon, felony assault, and three drunken driving convictions. He was on court-ordered probation from a DUI conviction at the time of the brawl.

In December 2004, five Pacers players and five Pistons fans (John Ackerman; John Green; Bryant Jackson; William Paulson; and David Wallace, Ben Wallace's brother) were charged with varying levels of assault and battery. Indiana's O'Neal, who also threw usher Melvin Kendziorski onto the scorer's table when attempting to enter the stands, and Pistons fan/spectator Green, who Gorcyca said "single-handedly incited" the brawl by throwing the cup at Artest, were charged with two counts.

Artest, Harrison, Jackson, and Anthony Johnson were charged with one count each. Three of the fans, including David Wallace, received one count of the same charge. Bryant Jackson, who had prior criminal convictions, was charged with felony assault for throwing a chair, which nearly hit O'Neal during the brawl. Two fans, Haddad and Shackleford, who entered the court during the fight were charged with trespassing. All of the fans involved were banned from attending Pistons home games.

In March 2005, Bryant Jackson pleaded no contest to a felony assault charge for throwing the chair. In May 2005, he was sentenced to two years' probation and ordered to pay $6,000 in restitution. David Wallace was convicted, and sentenced to one year of probation and community service for punching Pacers player Fred Jones from behind.

All five players who were charged pleaded no contest to the charges. In September 2005, Artest, Jackson, and O'Neal were all sentenced to one year on probation, 60 hours of community service, a $250 fine, and anger management counseling. A week later, Harrison received the same sentence. In October 2005, Johnson, the last player to be charged, received a similar sentence. He was ordered to serve 100 hours of community service.

In March 2006, a jury found Green guilty on one count of assault and battery for punching Artest in the stands. They acquitted him of an assault charge for throwing the cup. In May 2006, Green was sentenced to 30 days in jail and two years' probation. In November 2006, the Pistons issued a letter to Green informing him that he was banned for life from attending any Pistons home games under orders from the NBA. In a revision from his initial punishment two years prior, the ban no longer extended to other events at the Palace.

Aftermath

Public reaction
Several NBA players and coaches said the brawl was the worst fight they had ever seen. Hockey player Chris Chelios, who attended the game with Kid Rock, described the fight as unbelievable. Pacers fans began to refer to their team as "The Thugs". Pistons CEO Tom Wilson later stated that Artest's action took away physical barriers, such as tables and benches, that normally separate fans and players, and Indianapolis Star reporter Mark Montieth made the statement: "In a way, [Artest] provoked [the forthcoming assault] passively by lying down", even though Artest lying down was something he had done frequently to calm down. 

In the post-game commentary on ESPN's NBA Shootaround, ESPN studio analysts blamed the Pistons' fans and not the players. John Saunders referred to the fans as "a bunch of punks", and Tim Legler said that "the fans crossed the line". Stephen A. Smith stated that, "They should be ashamed of themselves and some of them [the fans] should be arrested as far as I'm concerned." Their commentary prompted ESPN vice president Mark Shapiro to place calls to host Saunders, as well as analysts Legler, Smith, and Greg Anthony, as Shapiro felt their commentary was biased. The following Tuesday, Shapiro stated, "I wish the studio hadn't laid the blame solely on the backs of the fans Friday night."

A significant portion of media criticism was directed at the Pistons fans. 46% of the voters in the SportsNation poll believed that the fans were to blame for the incident. Other commentators said that Artest and the other players involved were to blame.

NBA reforms
Some NBA teams immediately increased protection of players and arenas, while the NBA reminded teams of existing security procedures. The league imposed new security guidelines on February 17, 2005, for all of its arenas. The NBA also later ordered that each team put at least three security guards between the players and the fans.

Events after the brawl
The Pacers and the Pistons played for the first time after the brawl on December 25 at the Conseco Fieldhouse in Indianapolis, Indiana. The Pistons won 98–93 without incident. Neither Artest nor Jackson played due to their suspensions; O'Neal played in his first game back after the arbitrator reduced his suspension to 15 games.

On March 25, 2005, the Pacers played at the Palace for the first time since the brawl. The game was delayed 90 minutes after a series of bomb threats were aimed at the Pacers locker room, but the game eventually started after no explosives were found. Two of the key figures in the original incident missed the game, as Artest was still suspended and O'Neal had an injured shoulder. In the game, the Pacers stopped the Pistons' 12-game home winning streak with a 94–81 win.

In the 2005 NBA Playoffs, the Pistons entered as the second seed of the Eastern Conference, and the Pacers as the sixth. After the Pistons defeated the Philadelphia 76ers in five games, and the Pacers upset the third seed Boston Celtics in seven games, the two teams met in the second round. Although the Pacers went ahead two games to one, the Pistons clinched the series in six games with three straight wins. After eliminating Indiana, Detroit defeated the Miami Heat in the Eastern Conference Finals in seven games, then advanced to the NBA Finals, where they lost to the San Antonio Spurs in seven games.

After playing 16 games, he demanded to be traded, and the Pacers put him on the injured list. The Pacers' Walsh said that Artest's demands were "the last straw", and many Pacers players who had fought in the brawl to help their teammate felt betrayed. Jackson later said, "I put my career on the line for him, going into the stands and fighting ... I lost $3 million [but] there was no 'thank you' or nothing." 

After more than a month of inactivity, the Pacers traded Artest to the Sacramento Kings for Peja Stojaković. Artest faced Ben Wallace for the first time after the fight in November 2006, and made his return to Detroit in January 2007. During the Kings' 91–74 loss to the Pistons, Artest was booed constantly, but there were no unusual incidents. After a year's stop with the Houston Rockets in the 2008–09 season, Artest signed with the Los Angeles Lakers.

I'm on the Lakers, but I had a chance to win with you guys. I feel almost like a coward." On September 16, 2011, Artest legally changed his name to Metta World Peace.

During the lockout-shortened , only one of the nine players who were suspended after the brawl was still with his original team: Ben Wallace, who signed with the Chicago Bulls as a free agent in 2006, later traded to the Cleveland Cavaliers, and rejoined the Pistons on August 7, 2009. Most of the players involved were traded to other teams, and since then, all of the players involved in the brawl have retired, with Artest being the last to do so in 2017. 

The Pistons advanced to four straight Eastern Conference Finals after the brawl, and six straight overall, making them the first team since the Lakers in the 1980s to advance to six straight conference finals though they only won the championship once in that streak. Many Pacers from the 2004–05 season believe that the brawl and its consequences ruined a potential championship team, and that the referees did not assist the players well enough to be physically harmed by visitors.

On November 19, 2009, John Green, the fan who helped instigate the brawl, appeared on ESPN's First Take, where he talked about the incident and the changes he had made since then. Green recounted that he had an alcohol problem at the time and had since made an effort to deal with that. He said that Artest had apologized to him several months earlier, and wished to work together in some type of community service in Detroit. On June 9, 2017, Artest (then known as Metta World Peace) appeared on The Rich Eisen Show and alluded to his friendship with Green.

Almost 4 years after the incident, another similar incident happened also at the same arena, this time between the Los Angeles Sparks and the Detroit Shock (now known as the Dallas Wings) of the WNBA. This gave it the nickname "The Malice at The Palace II".

Box score 
Sources

See also
 2004-05 NBA season
 National Basketball Association criticisms and controversies
 List of violent spectator incidents in sports
 Bottlegate, a previous 2001 NFL incident which led to controls on beer sales and container types in that league
 Knicks–Nuggets brawl
 Sparks–Shock brawl
 2010 Acropolis Basketball Tournament brawl
 2011 Crosstown Shootout brawl
 Bonn–Bamberg basketball brawl
 Philippines–Australia basketball brawl

References

External links 
 
 Special Report: NBA Brawl by the Indianapolis Star

2004–05 NBA season
2004 in sports in Michigan
2004 crimes in the United States
Sports in Auburn Hills, Michigan
Brawls in team sports
Detroit Pistons games
Indiana Pacers games
Hooliganism
National Basketball Association controversies
National Basketball Association games
Riots and civil disorder in Michigan
Violence in sports
Sports controversies
Crimes in Michigan
November 2004 sports events in the United States
Nicknamed sporting events
Sports riots